Charles Mingus in Paris: The Complete America Session is a compilation of two albums by American bassist, composer and bandleader Charles Mingus which were recorded in Paris in 1970 and first released on the French America label as Blue Bird and Pithycanthropus Erectus. The compilation was released on the Sunnyside label in 2006 with all the released tracks combined on one CD and a second CD of additional tracks featuring false starts and incomplete takes from the session.

Reception
Ken Dryden of Allmusic stated, "After a five-year layoff from doing any studio recording, Mingus was fully prepared for this 1970 session...  The soloists shine throughout the date, with no one musician trying to outdo the others. This two-CD set adds all of the other material recorded during this single-day session on a separate disc, including all false starts, breakdowns, incomplete takes, and rehearsals, so serious fans can figure out how the performances evolved in the studio". Andrey Henkin from All About Jazz stated "The material is a strange assortment from various eras.. The longer tunes are more exciting but the shorter ones demonstrate Mingus' concern for strong composing, his or others"

Track listing
All compositions by Charles Mingus except where noted.

Disc one
 "I Left My Heart in San Francisco" (George Cory, Douglass Cross) - 4:06 Originally released on Blue Bird     
 "Reincarnation of a Lovebird" - 15:11 Originally released on Blue Bird      
 "Peggy's Blue Skylight" - 12:52 Originally released on Pithycanthropus Erectus      
 "Love Is a Dangerous Necessity" - 4:36 Originally released on Pithycanthropus Erectus      
 "Blue Bird" - 18:10 Originally released on Blue Bird     
 "Pithecanthropus Erectus" - 16:41 Originally released on Pithycanthropus Erectus
Also released as Reincarnation of Lovebird 2 LP set by Prestige records in 1970

Disc two
 "Reincarnation of a Lovebird" [Warm Up and First False Start] - 0:30     
 "Reincarnation of a Lovebird" [Second False Start] - 1:49     
 "Reincarnation of a Lovebird" [Third False Start] - 0:06     
 "Reincarnation of a Lovebird" [Incomplete Take] - 4:51     
 "Peggy's Blue Skylight" [First False Start] - 0:15     
 "Peggy's Blue Skylight" [Second False Start] - 0:15     
 "Peggy's Blue Skylight" [Third False Start and Rehearsal] - 0:37     
 "Peggy's Blue Skylight" [Alternate Take] - 9:47     
 "Blue Bird" [Incomplete Take] - 4:12     
 "Reprise" - 0:42     
 "Love Is a Dangerous Necessity" [First False Start] - 1:06     
 "Love Is a Dangerous Necessity" [Second False Start] - 1:49     
 "Pithecanthropus Erectus" [First Take, Incomplete] - 7:33     
 "Pithecanthropus Erectus" [Reprise] - 0:54     
 "Pithecanthropus Erectus" [Rehearsal] - 0:35     
 "Pithecanthropus Erectus" [False Start] - 0:09     
 "Pithecanthropus Erectus" [To the End] - 10:02     
 "Pithecanthropus Erectus" [Mingus Explanations, Restart] - 2:17

Personnel
Charles Mingus - bass
Eddie Preston - trumpet
Charles McPherson - alto saxophone
Bobby Jones - tenor saxophone
Jaki Byard - piano
Dannie Richmond - drums

References

1970 albums
2006 albums
Charles Mingus albums
Sunnyside Records albums